Miller's Landing may refer to:

 Original name of New Haven, Missouri
 Miller's Landing, an early settlement in Homer, Alaska